Double Take is an American hidden camera/practical joke reality show series that premiered on October 24, 2018, on Facebook Watch.

Premise
Double Take follows hypnotist Chris Jones as he "conspires with a different celebrity to give one adoring fan the surprise of a lifetime: meeting and interacting with their idol in a range of everyday circumstances, though – under hypnosis – unable to recognize them."

Production

Development
On August 22, 2018, it was announced that Facebook had given the production a series order for a first season consisting of six episodes. Executive producers were expected to include John Cena, Nick Rigg, David George, Simon Thomas, Adam Dolgins, Ken Schwab, and David Bulhack. Production companies involved in the series were slated to consist of Hard Nocks South Productions, Loud Television, and Ken Schwab Media.

Casting
Alongside the series order announcement, it was confirmed that the series would star hypnotist Chris Jones and feature guests including John Cena, Adam Rippon, Steve-O, NeNe Leakes, Gabriel Iglesias, and Pamela Anderson.

Episodes

See also
 List of original programs distributed by Facebook Watch

References

External links

2010s American reality television series
American non-fiction web series
English-language television shows
Facebook Watch original programming
2018 American television series debuts